José Alfredo Medina Andrade (born August 13, 1973) is a male track and road cyclist from Chile. He represented his native country at the 2000 Summer Olympics in Sydney, Australia. Medina won the elite time trial gold medal in the 2002 Pan American Championships held in Quito, Ecuador.

References

External links
 

1973 births
Living people
Chilean male cyclists
Cyclists at the 1996 Summer Olympics
Cyclists at the 2000 Summer Olympics
Cyclists at the 2003 Pan American Games
Olympic cyclists of Chile
Chilean sportspeople in doping cases
Doping cases in cycling
Vuelta Ciclista de Chile stage winners
Tour de Guadeloupe cyclists
Place of birth missing (living people)
Pan American Games bronze medalists for Chile
Pan American Games medalists in cycling
Medalists at the 2003 Pan American Games
20th-century Chilean people
21st-century Chilean people